CRS-2 may refer to:

SpaceX CRS-2, SpX-2, flight for SpaceX's uncrewed Dragon cargo spacecraft
Cygnus CRS Orb-2, CRS-2, flight for Orbital Sciences Cygnus cargo spacecraft
NASA Commercial Resupply Services — Phase 2
List of heliports in Canada#188, Parry Sound Medical Heliport (CRS2)

See also
 CRS (disambiguation)